Mark John Fleming (born 11 August 1969) is an English retired professional footballer who played as a left back in the Football League for Brentford and Queens Park Rangers.

Career

Queens Park Rangers 
Fleming began his career as a left back at First Division club Queens Park Rangers and made two appearances during the 1987–88 season. He also made an appearance in Rangers' 1988 President's Cup campaign. After just one appearance during the 1988–89 season, Fleming departed Loftus Road.

Brentford 
Fleming joined Third Division club Brentford in July 1989. He deputised for the injured Roger Stanislaus during the 1989–90 season and after the departure of Stanislaus in 1990, Fleming was expected to make the left back position his own in 1990–91. He failed to secure a place in the team and was replaced by loanees Stuart Cash and Jim Carstairs. Fleming rejected a monthly contract and departed at the end of the 1990–91 season, having made 45 appearances and scored one goal during his two years at Griffin Park.

Farnborough Town 
After his release from Brentford, Fleming dropped into non-League football and joined Conference club Farnborough Town. In 1992, he joined divisional rivals Woking and later played for Isthmian League Premier Division clubs Aylesbury United and Staines Town, captaining the latter club.

Career statistics

References

1969 births
Footballers from Hammersmith
English footballers
Brentford F.C. players
English Football League players
Queens Park Rangers F.C. players
Farnborough F.C. players
Association football fullbacks
Woking F.C. players
Aylesbury United F.C. players
National League (English football) players
Staines Town F.C. players
Isthmian League players
Living people